Nellai Royal Kings is one of the eight cricket franchises in Tamil Nadu Premier League (TNPL). With change in ownership, the team replaced VB Kanchi Veerans with Crown Forts Limited being the new owners. The team is based in Tirunelveli.

Current squad 
Arjun P Murthy
Trilok Nag .H
Jitendra Kumar CH
Sanjay Yadhav
Athisayaraj Davidson .V
Abhinav .M
Harish N S
Veeramani T
Pradosh Ranjan Paul
Sharun Kumar S
Ashwanth Mukunthan
Surya Prakash L
Senthil Nathan S
Sarath
Easwaran K
Baba Aparajith (c)
Manoj Zalu Yadav
Baba Indrajith

See also 
Salem Spartans
Chepauk Super Gillies
Kovai Kings
Madurai Panthers
Trichy Warriors
Tiruppur Tamizhans
Dindugal Dragons
 Tamil Nadu Premier League

References 

Club cricket teams